Prays acmonias is a moth of the  family Plutellidae. It is found in Pakistan.

The larvae feed on Viburnum species.

References

Plutellidae
Moths described in 1914